Mathura is a village in West Champaran district in the Indian state of Bihar. Specially recognized for champaran meat.

History
Mathura was founded by Bodha Shah, whose descendants still live in the entire majestic style of this village. Rajkiya Ram Chandara Lalji High and Middle school were established by their descendants.
The credit for the modernization of Mathura goes to the kalwar ruler Madan Mohan Prasad. Mathura is famous for an ancient Shiva Temple and the Mother Durga Temple. Most people are of religious nature. This land area was ruled by the Kalachuri dynasty. This market is located on Narkatiyaganj-Raxaul railways and road, Nepal's distance is just 12km. 

The main source of earning is Agriculture. Paddy, Mustard, Sugarcane and Wheat are the main crops.

As of 2011 India census, Mathura had a population of 2677 in 496 households. Males constitute 52.7% of the population and females 47.2%. Mathura has an average literacy rate of 36.12%, lower than the national average of 74%: male literacy is 66.49%, and female literacy is 33.5%. In Mathura, 22.2% of the population is under 6 years of age.

References

Villages in West Champaran district